Pavlo Serhiyovych Korostylov (born 5 November 1997) is a Ukrainian sport shooter. He is the 2016 European 10 m pistol bronze medalist.

Career
He is a two-time European junior champion (2012 and 2013) and a gold medalist in the boys' 10 m air pistol at the 2014 Youth Olympic Games in Nanjing, China. Korostylov currently trains for the shooting team at Lviv Sports Club Academy, under his coaching parents Valentina and Serhiy Korostylov. Coming from a sporting pedigree, Korostylov also shares the same discipline with his older sister Yuliya Korostylova, who competed in pistol shooting for Ukraine at the 2004 Summer Olympics in Athens.

Korostylov flourished his early sporting success at the 2014 Summer Youth Olympics in Nanjing, China, where he fired a final junior world record at 203.4 to secure a gold medal victory in the boys' 10 m air pistol, surpassing then 14-year-old South Korean shooter Kim Cheong-yong by a solid 3.6-point lead.

On his senior debut at the inaugural 2015 European Games in Baku, Azerbaijan, Korostylov finished fifth in the men's 10 m air pistol final with an astonishing score of 138.2, beating his teammate Oleh Omelchuk by more than twenty-two points. With four other shooters ahead of him having already filled their Olympic quotas in the previous qualification tournaments, Korostylov has guaranteed a place on the Ukrainian squad, and is expected to compete for Ukraine at the 2016 Summer Olympics in Rio de Janeiro.

References

External links

1997 births
Living people
Ukrainian male sport shooters
Shooters at the 2014 Summer Youth Olympics
Sportspeople from Lviv
Shooters at the 2015 European Games
Olympic shooters of Ukraine
Shooters at the 2016 Summer Olympics
Shooters at the 2020 Summer Olympics
ISSF pistol shooters
Shooters at the 2019 European Games
European Games medalists in shooting
European Games bronze medalists for Ukraine
Youth Olympic gold medalists for Ukraine
Laureates of the Prize of the Cabinet of Ministers of Ukraine for special achievements of youth in the development of Ukraine
21st-century Ukrainian people